The year 1930 was marked, in science fiction, by the following events.

Births and deaths

Births 
 June 3 : Marion Zimmer Bradley, American writer (died 1999)
 November 15 : J. G. Ballard, British writer (died 2009)
 Donald Malcolm, Scottish writer (died 2013)

Deaths

Events 
 Creation of the American magazine Astounding Stories of Super-Science, now called Analog Science Fiction and Fact.

Literary releases

Novels 
 Last and First Men, by Olaf Stapledon.
 Tarzan at the Earth's Core, by Edgar Rice Burroughs.
  Utopolis, by  Werner Illing.

Stories collections

Short stories

Comics

Audiovisual outputs

Movies 
 Just Imagine directed by David Butler

Awards 
The main science-fiction Awards known at the present time did not exist at this time.

See also 
 1930 in science
 1929 in science fiction
 1931 in science fiction

References

Science fiction by year

science-fiction